Herbert Foster Ward (24 March 1873 – 6 June 1897) was an English footballer, who played as a forward for two seasons with Southampton, and a cricketer who played as a right-handed batsman for Hampshire.

Football career
Born in Hammersmith, he attended Bruce Castle School in Tottenham, before training as a schoolteacher. His teaching career took him to Handel College in Southampton. He joined Southampton St. Mary's initially as a left winger and played in the Saints' two FA Cup qualifying matches in November as well as friendlies and local cup matches.

In 1894 Southampton were founder members of the Southern League. In the inaugural season Ward was asked to take over the role of centre forward. According to Holley & Chalk's "Alphabet of the Saints" he was "a tireless worker at all times"; he was joint top-scorer (with Charles Baker and Jack Angus) for the team for the 1894–95 season with six league goals from only nine appearances, and his goalscoring abilities earned him five Hampshire County caps, two as captain.

He also made six FA Cup appearances, scoring six goals, including three in a 14–0 defeat of Newbury at the Antelope Ground on 13 October 1894; this is still Southampton's biggest victory in a competitive match. Saints reached the First Round proper for the first time, going out 1–4 to Football League First Division opponents Nottingham Forest, with Ward scoring Saints' consolation goal.

Cricket career

In 1895 he quit football to concentrate on his cricket career. Ward made his County Championship debut for Hampshire in the first match the team played in the competition during 1895. The team acquitted themselves well, finishing in tenth place, with six wins under their belt, and Ward with three half-centuries, his first coming in the first match of the season, against Somerset. This score of 71 was the highest score of his season, not bettered until he scored his first of two career centuries, against Derbyshire in May 1896.

Ward was a frequent participant in the 1896 County Championship season, leading the Hampshire attack, along with former Middlesex player, and future Hampshire captain, Charles Robson, who was also the secretary/manager of Southampton Football Club. Ward bowled frequently for Hampshire in his later seasons, picking up nineteen wickets for the team, including a best bowling analysis of 4–17 against Sussex in July 1896.

Hampshire finished ninth in the 1897 County Championship table, with a negative finishing percentage. Ward died just seventeen days after his final County Cricket match, still in full flow of the 1897 cricket season, at the age of 24, possibly a club record for the shortest amount of time between an individual's final first-class fixture and their death. At first the cause of death was presumed to be sunstroke but it was subsequently diagnosed as typhoid fever.

Herbert's brother, Charles Ward, cousin Leonard Ward and uncle Charles Ward were all first-class cricketers.

References

External links

1873 births
Footballers from Hammersmith
1897 deaths
People educated at Bruce Castle School
English cricketers
Hampshire cricketers
English footballers
Southampton F.C. players
Southern Football League players
Deaths from typhoid fever
Infectious disease deaths in England
Association football forwards